Poljica is a village on the island of Krk, Croatia.

Location
Poljica is located on the western part of the island of Krk, in the area of the island called Šotovento. Like all settlements in Šotovento, Poljica is not on the coast but in the interior of the island, about 3 km southeast of Čavlena bay. In the immediate vicinity are the villages Bajčići and Nenadići. Approximately 6 km away is Malinska and about 10 km is the town of Krk.

The village is located just off the D104 Road.

History 
In ancient times this area was inhabited by the Illyrians. In the Middle Ages, until the 15th century, this part of the island was predominantly deserted and poorly inhabited. In order to increase tax revenues, Ivan VII Frankopan settled in the mid-15th century in this area and in the area around Dubašnica, and also between the castles of Dobrinj and Omišalj, Vlachs and Morlachs (Romanians, later Istro-Romanians) from Velebit. However, there were very few true ethnic Vlachs among them, most of whom were Croats.

Poljica had the greatest significance in the second half of the 19th century. At about the same time, in 1848, the first school opened in Šotovento. Until then, the only educational institution had been a Franciscan monastery at Glavotok.

Population 
According to the last census of 2001, there were 62 inhabitants in Poljica.

Population growth has been moderate. Since there have been official data since the middle of the 19th century, Poljica had a mild and gradual increase in population by mid-20th century. In 1953, they had a maximum of 89 residents. Since then, the population has declined slightly.

Economy 
Poljica is surrounded by traditional agricultural land. The most important are field crops, cattle breeding and olive trees. Nearby in Nenadići is a food-processing plant. Much of the residents work in nearby bigger places on the island such as Malinska or Krk.

Due to its in the interior of the island, tourism has not developed. However Poljica is not far from the sea, and it has preserved indigenous architecture with old stone houses.

Culture 

Although a small village, Poljica has many Renaissance buildings. Among them, the bell tower of the parish church of Saints Cosmas and Damian is made of fine chrome stone. It was built in 1768, and before it there was another, smaller tower. At its height of 29 meters dominates the village and the surrounding area.

A beach at Čavlena Bay is 3 km from Poljica.

Nearby in the woods at Čavlena bay there is a small early Christian church of St. Krševan. It is not known who built it, but it is considered to be from the 9th century.

Not far from Poljica, above the Čavlena Bay, there are the largest specimens of oak on the island of Krk. They are considered to be about 400 years old.

See also
Republic of Poljica

References

Further reading 
 Bolonić, Mihovil, Žic Rokov, Ivan: Krk Island Through the Ages, Christian Present, Zagreb, 2002.
 Lešić, Denis: The Island of Krk: Guide to Word and Image, 2003.

Krk
Populated places in Primorje-Gorski Kotar County